Alexandra Palace is a closed railway station in the grounds of Alexandra Palace in the Muswell Hill area of north London. It is one of a number of stations to have held the name at various times and should not be confused with the current Alexandra Palace station which is on the East Coast Main Line to the east of the closed station.

The former station was the terminus of a short branch line from Highgate. The station was located immediately adjacent to the north side of the Palace buildings. Nothing remains of the tracks or island platform today, which have been removed and covered by a car park, but the small station building remains and is in use as a community centre.

History

The station was built by the Muswell Hill Railway (MHR) and opened on 24 May 1873 along with the Palace. However, when the Palace burned down only two weeks after opening, the train service was considerably reduced and from 1 August 1873 was stopped for almost two years whilst the Palace was rebuilt. The station reopened on 1 May 1875, but there were several further periods of temporary closure due to insufficient demand, including from August 1882 to March 1885 and September 1885 to May 1889. When it reopened in March 1891 after another closure it was renamed Alexandra Park in reference to the wider area rather than just the Palace in order to stoke higher demand. The increased demand did not materialise, and the original Alexandra Palace name was restored in 1898.

In 1911 the line was taken over by the Great Northern Railway. After the 1921 Railways Act created the "Big Four" railway companies, the line was, from 1923, part of the London and North Eastern Railway (LNER). 

Works to modernise the track began in the late 1930s and were well advanced when they were interrupted and halted by the Second World War. Works were completed from Highgate to High Barnet and Mill Hill East and that section was incorporated into the Northern line. Further works on the section between Highgate and Alexandra Palace were postponed and the line continued under the operation of the LNER. Because of wartime economy measures, services were reduced to rush hours only, so that after the war the dwindling passenger numbers and a shortage of funds led to the cancellation of the unfinished works in 1950. British Railways (the successor to the LNER) closed the line temporarily from 29 October 1951 until 7 January 1952,. With dwindling passenger numbers passenger services to Alexandra Palace last operated on British Railways on 3 July 1954 along with the rest of the line from Finsbury Park.

The line as far as Muswell Hill continued to be used for goods traffic until 18 May 1957 when the section between Muswell Hill and Highgate was closed altogether. The tracks between Highgate and Finsbury Park were retained until the 1970s to enable the Northern City Line's tube stock to be transferred to and from Highgate depot and, as the tracks were not electrified, the trains had to be hauled by battery locomotives. Today the track has been removed and many of the platforms and station buildings have been demolished. At  the former Station Master's house still stands and sees residential use, but the platforms and buildings have been removed. The track bed between Muswell Hill and Finsbury Park is now largely part of the Parkland Walk.

See also
 Edgware, Highgate and London Railway
 Palace Gates railway station

References

Bibliography

Further reading

External links
 Alexandra Palace station in 1935.
 Disused Stations - Alexandra Palace

Disused railway stations in the London Borough of Haringey
Former Great Northern Railway stations
Railway stations in Great Britain opened in 1873
Railway stations in Great Britain closed in 1951
Railway stations in Great Britain opened in 1952
Railway stations in Great Britain closed in 1954
Proposed London Underground stations
Unopened Northern Heights extension stations
Unopened tube stations in the London Borough of Haringey
Alexandra Palace
1873 establishments in England
1954 disestablishments in England